Danny Brian McNulty (born May 28, 1972) is an American actor and producer who is best known for playing Harvey "Harley" Keiner  on Boy Meets World and later on its spinoff Girl Meets World.

Filmography

References

External links
 

Living people
American male television actors
Place of birth missing (living people)
20th-century American male actors
21st-century American male actors
American producers
1972 births